The 2021 Newfoundland and Labrador Scotties Tournament of Hearts, the women's provincial curling championship for Newfoundland and Labrador, was held from January 29 to 30 at the RE/MAX Centre in St. John's, Newfoundland and Labrador. The winning Sarah Hill rink represented Newfoundland and Labrador at the 2021 Scotties Tournament of Hearts in Calgary, Alberta, and finished with a 2–6 record. The event was held in conjunction with the 2021 Newfoundland and Labrador Tankard, the provincial men's championship.

Due to the COVID-19 pandemic in Newfoundland and Labrador, many teams could not commit to the quarantine process in order to compete at the national championship. Clubmates Sarah Hill and Mackenzie Mitchell were the only two teams to enter the event. Team Hill won the best of five series three games to one.

Teams
The teams are listed as follows:

Results
All draw times are listed in Newfoundland Time (UTC−03:30).

Standings
Final Standings

Draw 1
Friday, January 29, 2:30 pm

Draw 2
Friday, January 29, 7:30 pm

Draw 3
Saturday, January 30, 9:30 am

Draw 4
Saturday, January 30, 7:30 pm

References

External links

Newfoundland and Labrador
Curling in Newfoundland and Labrador
January 2021 sports events in Canada
2021 in Newfoundland and Labrador
Sport in St. John's, Newfoundland and Labrador